How Lucky I Am is the fourth studio album by American country music artist Bryan White. It was released in 1999 (see 1999 in country music) on Asylum Records. The album included two singles: "You're Still Beautiful to Me" which reached number 39 on the Country chart and "God Gave Me You" at number 40. Dann Huff produced tracks 1–3 and 6–8, and White co-produced the remainder of the album with Derek George.

Stephen Thomas Erlewine gave the album three stars out of five, with his review saying that its sound was "more suited for adult contemporary stations than contemporary country" but adding that the album worked "in small doses."

Track listing

Personnel
Tim Akers - keyboards
Taz Bentley - Fender Rhodes, keyboards, mellotron, Hammond organ, piano, background vocals
Mike Brignardello - bass guitar
Larry Byrom - acoustic guitar
Max Carl - Hammond organ, background vocals, Wurlitzer
Randle Currie - pedal steel guitar
Eric Darken - percussion
Stuart Duncan - fiddle, mandolin
Scotty Emerick - acoustic guitar, background vocals
Joe Finger- djembe, drums, percussion, udu, background vocals
Paul Franklin - pedal steel guitar
Derek George - 12-string electric guitar, acoustic guitar, electric guitar, background vocals
Carl Gorodetzky - string contractor
Paul Hantzis - background vocals
Aubrey Haynie - fiddle
Lee Hendricks - bass guitar, background vocals
Dann Huff - electric guitar
Ronn Huff - string arrangements 
Jeff King - electric guitar
Chris Leuzinger - electric guitar
Leslie Liddell - background vocals
Paul Leim - drums
B. James Lowry - acoustic guitar
Brent Mason - electric guitar
Mac McAnally - acoustic guitar
The Nashville String Machine - strings
Steve Nathan - keyboards, piano
Erika Page - background vocals
Chris Rodriguez - background vocals
Matt Rollings - keyboards
Harry Stinson - background vocals
Brinson Strickland - electric guitar, background vocals
John Tirro - background vocals
Steve Wariner - acoustic guitar
Bergen White - string arrangements 
Bryan White - cowbell, acoustic guitar, percussion, shaker, tambourine, lead vocals, background vocals
Lynn Williams - drums, percussion
Lonnie Wilson - drums, drum loops, shaker, tambourine

Chart performance

References

1999 albums
Asylum Records albums
Bryan White albums
Albums produced by Dann Huff
Albums produced by Derek George